Damodharan K., professionally known as Chef Damu, is an Indian celebrity chef. He has hosted numerous cooking shows and reality cooking competitions on various Tamil language television channels, most notably a s a judge on Cooku with Comali on Star Vijay. In 2010, he received a Guinness World Record for the longest cooking marathon by a single individual. He also became the first Indian chef to receive Ph.D in Hotel Management and Catering Technology, which was awarded by the University of Madras in 2004. Furthermore, he has made a few appearances in Tamil films.

Career 
In December 2010, Damodharan cooked 617 dishes consisting of 190 kilograms of food in a day. He began cooking at 8 o'clock in the morning on 21 December and cooked for a period of 24 hours, 30 minutes, and 12 seconds. Damodharan was also a judge at The Hindu'''s Our State Our Taste competition for 15 cities in Tamil Nadu.

 Onscreen appearances 

 Films Kallappadam (2015)Ulkuthu (2017)Oru Pakka Kathai (2020)Server Sundaram (TBA)

 Web series Kalyanam Conditions Apply (2018)

 TV Series Dhe chef (Mazhavil Manorama)Athu Ithu Yethu (Cameo appearance)Chocolate (Cameo Appearance)Cooku With Comali season 1Cooku with Comali season 2 Colors Kitchen Cooku with Comali season 3 Cook with Comali season 4''

References

External links 
 
Chef Damu on Twitter
Chef Damodaran on Facebook

Chefs of Indian cuisine
Living people
People from Tamil Nadu
Year of birth missing (living people)